The October 2017 Northern California wildfires, also known as the  Northern California firestorm,  North Bay Fires, and the Wine Country Fires were a series of 250 wildfires that started burning across the state of California, United States, beginning in early October. Twenty-one became major fires that burned at least . 

The wildfires broke out throughout Napa, Lake, Sonoma, Mendocino, Butte, and Solano Counties during severe fire weather conditions, effectively leading to a major red flag warning for much of the Northern California area. Pacific Gas and Electric reported that red flag conditions existed in 44 of the 49 counties in its service area.  Seventeen separate wildfires were reported at that time. These fires included the Tubbs Fire (which grew to become the most destructive wildfire in the history of California up until that time - fires in 2018 were more destructive), the Atlas Fire, Nuns Fire, and others. 

These wildfires were also the most destructive ones of the 2017 California wildfire season. The October 2017 fires were the costliest group of wildfires on record at the time, causing around $14.5 billion (2017 USD) in damages, including $11 billion in insured losses and $1.5 billion in fire suppression costs, surpassing the 1991 Oakland firestorm, which until then had been the single costliest fire on record. In addition, the Northern California fires were predicted to cost the US economy at least $85 billion. In 2018, the Camp Fire surpassed the October 2017 fires to become the single-costliest fire on record, causing an estimated $16.5 billion (2018 USD) in property damage.

By October 14, the fires had burned more than  while forcing 90,000 people to evacuate from their homes. In total, the Northern California fires killed 44 people and hospitalized at least 192 others, making this one of the deadliest wildfire events in the United States during the past century.

Weather
By the evening of October 8, the Diablo winds were reported gusting up to  within the affected areas as over a dozen wildfires began to break out.

Impact and reaction
Many of those killed in the fires are believed to have died late on October 8 or early on October 9, 2017, when most of the fires broke out overnight. Most of the victims were elderly, though the ages of the victims ranged from 14 to 100 years old.

On October 9, California governor Jerry Brown declared a state of emergency for the counties of Napa, Sonoma, Yuba, Butte, Lake, Mendocino, Nevada, and Orange, and sent a letter to the White House requesting a major disaster declaration. President Donald Trump approved the disaster declaration on October 10. That evening, Governor Brown issued an emergency declaration for Solano County. Surveying the region, representative Mike Thompson of California's 5th congressional district said, "I fully expect this will be the worst fire disaster in California history."

More than 10,000 firefighters battled the blaze, using more than 1,000 fire engines and other equipment, with crews arriving from as far away as Canada and Australia.

Pacific Gas and Electric Company (PG&E) reported mobilizing 4,300 workers to restore power. It also said that more than 350,000 customers had lost electric service and 42,000 customers gas service since the wildfires began on October 8. By October 14, PG&E had restored electricity to 92% and gas service to 16,800 of the customers affected.

Reinsurance broker Aon Benfield stated that these are the costliest wildfires in U.S. history, with an estimated eight billion U.S. dollars in insured losses.  The largest portion of these losses was to residential property.  Additional losses were to automobiles, commercial property including business interruption insurance, and to crops.  Many of the losses were in urban areas not historically prone to wildfire exposure.

Air pollution

By October 12, the air quality in the city of Napa was ranked the poorest in the nation, due to high levels of particulates and ozone. By October 13, air quality in the city reached the "hazardous" level, the most dangerous on the Environmental Protection Agency  scale. In Solano County, over 250 people were sickened by smoke inhalation, and sought care at hospitals. Twenty-three were admitted to emergency rooms.

By October 12, smoke from the wildfires had spread nearly 100 miles, with "unhealthy" air quality indices registered in the cities of Oakland, San Francisco, and San Rafael. Due to the poor air quality, San Francisco State University canceled classes, and outdoor activities were canceled in a number of cities, including Danville, Palo Alto, and Walnut Creek. Visibility issues spurred the Federal Aviation Administration to implement a ground delay program  at San Francisco International Airport, and nearly 280 flights were canceled over a three-day period. Over a week after the fires started, flights continued to be canceled and delayed due to poor visibility from the smoke.

Fires

Cherokee Fire
The Cherokee Fire broke out on the evening of Sunday, October 8, near Oroville in Butte County just after 9 PM PDT. Reportedly igniting near Cherokee Road, the fire quickly expanded from hundreds to thousands of acres within a few hours of burning as it threatened nearby Oroville and surrounding rural neighborhoods.

Atlas Fire

The Atlas Fire burned Napa County, north of the city of Napa, near Napa Soda Springs. On October 29, the fire had burned  and was 100% contained.

Tubbs Fire

The Tubbs Fire started near Tubbs Lane in Calistoga on the evening of October 8, 2017, and burned at least . In the Fountain Grove area numerous homes, the Fountaingrove Inn, the historic Round Barn, and a Hilton resort were destroyed. By October 14, the death toll from this fire alone had risen to 20. By October 20, the Tubbs Fire had become the most destructive wildfire in the history of California. This was later surpassed by the Camp Fire (2018).

A filing by PG&E to the judge overseeing PG&E's probation for the 2010 San Bruno fire said that the Tubbs Fire may have started with privately owned equipment on private property for which PG&E was not responsible.

Nuns Fire
The Nuns Fire, centered in the areas to the east and north of the city of Sonoma, merged with the Norrbom fire on October 11. The Adobe fire merged with Nuns/Norrbom on October 12. The Partrick fire joined the four-fire conflagration on October 13.

Investigation
Based on the investigation by CalFire, it has been found that Pacific Gas & Electric equipment was the cause of all of the individual fires except for the Tubbs Fire. In January 2019 CalFire determined the Tubbs Fire was caused by incorrectly maintained electrical equipment owned by a private landowner. However, in August 2019 a fast-track jury trial was scheduled to revisit whether or not PG&E was the cause of the Tubbs Fire.

News media noted reports of wind-damaged power equipment around the time the fires were starting.  Pacific Gas & Electric stated that strong winds had affected the utility's power lines in the North Bay area on late October 8 and early October 9.  A California Department of Forestry and Fire Protection (CAL FIRE) spokesperson stated that investigators were considering this among other possible causes.

The California Public Utilities Commission sent PG&E a notification to preserve equipment, emails, and documents relevant to the utility's tree-trimming program.

CAL FIRE Director Ken Pimlott discouraged premature speculation of causes, stating that, "The facts will come out when the investigations are done."

Wildfire victim claims
On July 1, 2020, the PG&E Fire Victim Trust (FVT) was established as part of the reorganization plan of the 2019 bankruptcy of PG&E to administer the claims of the wildfire victims. Also on July 1, PG&E funded the Fire Victim Trust (FVT) with $5.4 billion in cash and 22.19% of stock in the reorganized PG&E, which covers most of the obligations of its settlement for the wildfire victims. PG&E has two more payments totaling $1.35 billion in cash, scheduled to be paid in January 2021 and January 2022, to complete its obligations to the wildfire victims.

Claimants are wildfire victims from the 2017 North Bay Fires, 2015 Butte Fire, and 2018 Camp Fire in Northern California. The 2017 Tubbs Fire is considered to be one of the 2017 North Bay Fires. The court case for the Tubbs Fire was superseded by the PG&E Restructuring Support Agreement (RSA) of December 9, 2019 and by the PG&E bankruptcy reorganization plan, wherein PG&E accepted liability for the Tubbs Fire.

See also

 2017 California wildfires
 December 2017 Southern California wildfires
 October 2007 California wildfires
 Oakland firestorm of 1991
 Recloser
 Witch Fire
 San Diego Gas and Electric
 Pacific Gas and Electric

References

External links
 Interactive map of fires (San Francisco Chronicle)

October 2017 events in the United States